The New Venture Gear 3500, commonly called NV3500, is a 5-speed overdrive manual transmission manufactured by New Venture Gear and used by GM and Dodge in compact and full-size light trucks.
It can be identified by its two-piece aluminum case with integrated bell housing and top-mounted tower shifter.

Similar transmissions
In North America the NV3550 is used by Jeep with the 4.0L inline 6.  It looks similar to and could be mistaken for the Dodge NV3500. However the Jeep NV3550 bellhousing bolts to the transmission case.

There are four GM medium duty transmission designs that led to and are often mistaken for the NV3500: 
 
 1987 MG-290 MG= Muncie Gear
 1988 HM-290 HM= Hydramatic Muncie 
 1989 5LM60 (early)
 1991 NVG 5LM60 (lateNVG= New Venture Gear 
 1993 New Venture Gear releases the NV3500.  Externally the earlier GM units look like the NV3500; however the internal components were extensively redesigned.
 The HM290 and 5LM60 units have a complicated arrangement of 4 shift rails. The NV3500 has one shift rail.
 There are two designs for the 5LM60 input shaft and bearings (input shaft and main shaft). The first design 1988–1990 has a ball bearing with a roller bearing behind it. The second design has a much larger single ball bearing. The first design bearings are reputed to be failure prone.  The updated input shaft and bearings carried through to the NV3500.
 All 5 of these transmissions can be interchanged as a complete unit with the following caveats.
"Drop-in" interchanges between GM S (S10 etc.) and C/K trucks will require modification of driveshaft length and crossmember placement. GM S models have a longer tail-shaft than C/K trucks.
 Master & slave cylinder bore sizes went from standard to metric in 1992 (Master: 11/16"->18mm, Slave 13/16" ->20mm)
 GM and Dodge transmissions will not interchange.
The case and bellhousing are one piece with differing, engine specific, bellhousing bolt patterns.
Dodge uses Dodge specific input shaft length, spline count, and  pilot diameter.
Dodge output spline count differs from the GM units.

Lubrication
Lubricants for the NV3500:

OEM Recommended: 
 Mopar Manual Transmission Lubricant (4874464)
GM Synchromesh Transmission Fluid (in US 12377916 in Canada 10953465)
Less expensive alternatives CERTIFIED to meet GM 9985648 and Chrysler MS-9224:
 AMSOIL Synthetic Synchromesh Transmission Fluid (MTF) 
 Pennzoil Synchromesh Fluid
 Royal Purple Synchromax
 Royal Purple Max Gear
 RAVENOL STF Synchromesh Transmission Fluid

Capacity:
 NV3500 4.2 pints DRY is stated in the Owners Manual and the Service Manual. 
 NV3500-HD 2.0 Litres is stated in the Owners Manual and the Service Manual.
When performing a fluid change some of the old oil will not drain out.

NOTE:
5W30 engine oil does not contain additives for use in manual transmissions.
Additives in standard gear and axle lubes will etch the bronze synchronizers and 80W oil will not properly flow into the NV3500 bearings.

Applications of the NV3500
 1993–1998 Chevrolet & GMC CK with 4.3 liter V6 and 5.0 liter V8 and 5.7 liter V8
 1999–2006 Chevrolet Silverado 1500 and 2500LD
 1999–2006 GMC Sierra 1500 and 2500LD 
 1993–2003 GM S (S10 etc.) trucks with 4.3 liter V6
 1994–2004 Dodge Ram 1500 
 1994–1995 Dodge Ram 2500 Light Duty
 1994-2004 Dodge Dakota
 2002-2004 Jeep Liberty with 3.7 L PowerTech V6
 2000-2004  Jeep Wrangler with 4.0 AMC Straight 6

Dodge Ram order code DDC

General Motors RPO codes
Full-size CK, Silverado, Sierra MG5 
Small trucks S10 etc.  M50

Features

 Single shift rail unlike the HM290 and 5LM60
 Distance between the centerline of the mainshaft and the countershaft is 85mm.
 Fully synchronized forward and reverse gears.
 A two piece aluminum housing with no access plates.
 A shift tower mounted shift lever.
 GM RPO codes;
Wide-ratio MG5
Close-ratio M50
 Dodge order code DDC
 The Medium duty version is rated for 300 ft-lbf of torque 
 The Dodge Dakota NV3500-HD version was rated for 340ft-lb of torque.  There is no GM variant of the NV3500-HD.
 Max GVWR: 7,200 lb
 Max GCVWR: 11,000 lb
 Weight 110 lb with oil

Wide Ratio Gearing Option in Dodge 1500 & GM Full-size Light Trucks:

Close Ratio GM S/T Small Trucks & 2500 Light Duty Dodge Ram Truck Gearing:

Close Ratio NV3500-HD Dodge Dakota Gearing:

Instructions
These are considered extremely difficult transmissions to rebuild. Special tools are required for a full rebuild.

References

External links
 NV3500 Label Codes

New Venture transmissions
General Motors transmissions